John-Roy Jenkinson (born 26 March 1991 in Worcester) is a South African rugby union player for Rugby ATL in Major League Rugby (MLR). He also plays for the Munakata Sanix Blues in the Japanese Top League. His regular position is prop.

Career

Youth

He played for a KwaZulu-Natal Country Districts team at the 2008 Academy Week and played for KwaZulu-Natal at the 2009 Under-18 Craven Week.

He then moved to Potchefstroom and played rugby for the  team in 2010 and the  team in the 2011 Under-21 Provincial Championship competitions.

Senior career

He made a further nine appearances the following season in the 2012 Currie Cup First Division.

He was a member of the  team that won the 2015 Currie Cup First Division. He featured in a total of thirteen matches during the 2015 Currie Cup qualification rounds and First Division proper and scored two tries for the side.

Varsity Cup rugby

This also led to his inclusion in the South African Students team in 2012. He was named in a Varsity Cup Dream Team at the conclusion of the 2015 Varsity Cup tournament which played one match against the South Africa Under-20s in Stellenbosch.

Representative rugby

In 2011, he played for the South Africa Under-20 team in the 2011 IRB Junior World Championship.

References

1991 births
South African rugby union players
Living people
Free State Cheetahs players
South African people of British descent
Rugby union players from Worcester, South Africa
Leopards (rugby union) players
South Africa Under-20 international rugby union players
Blue Bulls players
Bulls (rugby union) players
Munakata Sanix Blues players
Griquas (rugby union) players
Rugby ATL players
Rugby union props